Sébastien Grax (born 23 June 1984) is a French former professional footballer who played as a striker.

Career
Grax started his career at Monaco in 2001 where he played four matches in three years. He was then loaned out to Troyes AC in 2004 where he contributed 16 goals in 35 matches to the club's promotion to Ligue 1. In Ligue, he scored 9 goals for the club. His most famous goal came against Lille OSC in 2005 when Troyes were newly promoted and Lille were in the UEFA Champions League.

Grax spent 1.5 seasons at FC Sochaux-Montbéliard, scoring 6 goals in 25 league appearances. While at Sochaux he played as they won the 2007 Coupe de France Final.

In June 2008, Grax joined Saint-Étienne.

Grax had a trial with Championship side Crystal Palace in August 2010 followed by another with Preston North End in December.

References

External links

Living people
1984 births
Sportspeople from Le Creusot
Association football forwards
French footballers
Montauban FCTG players
SC Draguignan players
AS Monaco FC players
AS Saint-Étienne players
ES Troyes AC players
FC Sochaux-Montbéliard players
En Avant Guingamp players
Ligue 1 players
Ligue 2 players
France youth international footballers
France under-21 international footballers
Footballers from Bourgogne-Franche-Comté